Manoel Henriques Ribeiro (15 May 1945 – 18 January 2022) was a Brazilian politician.

He served as Deputy Governor of Amazonas from 1983 to 1985 and was Mayor of Manaus from 1986 to 1988. He died on 18 January 2022, at the age of 76.

References

1945 births
2022 deaths
Mayors of Manaus
Vice Governors of Amazonas (Brazilian state)